Anna Theresa Cascio (born November 7, 1955), sometimes billed as Anna Cascio, is an American writer. She has written plays and for television, particularly for soap operas.

Television 

All My Children
 Co-Head Writer: February 24, 2003 - June 30, 2003

As the World Turns
Breakdown Writer: November 1, 2005 - September 18, 2007

One Life to Live
 Breakdown Writer: 1996 - 2002, Fall 2003 - September 26, 2005, December 11, 2007 - February 22, 2008, May 2, 2008 - January 13, 2012

General Hospital
 Breakdown Writer: August 17, 2012 – present

The Days and Nights of Molly Dodd
 Writer

Theater
In 1988–89, the Manhattan Class Company performed her Bikini Snow Off-Off-Broadway and En Garde Arts presented her play Minny and the James Boys.

A scene from her play June 8, 1968 was included in the book Duo!: Best Scenes for the 90's. Her play Crystal was "critically acclaimed" and premiered by the Theater of the First Amendment in Fairfax. She and Leslie Arden co wrote the book for The House of Martin Guerre.

Her play Broad Channel, co written with Doc Dougherty, ran from April 13, to May 4, 2003.

Awards and nominations
Daytime Emmy Award

Nomination, 2002 & 2006, Best Writing, One Life to Live
Nomination, 2004, Best Writing, All My Children

Writers Guild of America Award
Win, 2006, Best Writing, As the World Turns
Nomination, 2003 & 2005, Best Writing, One Life to Live
Win, 2003, Best Writing, All My Children

References

External links

American soap opera writers
1955 births
Living people
Writers Guild of America Award winners